Sir Matthew William Thompson Bt (1 February 1820 – 1 December 1891) was a British railway director and Liberal Party politician.

He was elected as Member of Parliament (MP) for Bradford in West Yorkshire at a by-election in 1867, but did not contest the 1868 general election.

Life
Born at Manningham in the West Riding of Yorkshire, he was the son of Matthew Thompson of Manningham Lodge, Bradford, by Elizabeth Sarah, daughter of the Rev. William Atkinson of Thorparch. He was educated at private schools and at Trinity College, Cambridge, where he matriculated in 1840, graduating B.A. in 1843 and M.A. in 1846. He was called to the bar at the Inner Temple in 1847, and for ten years practised as a conveyancing counsel.

Having married on 10 May 1843 Mary Anne, daughter of his uncle, Benjamin Thompson of Parkgate, Guiseley, who possessed the controlling influence in the old brewery at Bradford, he retired from the bar in 1857 and went to Bradford to take a part in the management and development of the brewery. Almost immediately he began to take an active share in the conduct of municipal affairs, becoming a town councillor in 1858, an alderman in 1860, and mayor of Bradford in 1862. In 1865 he was elected a director of the Midland Railway, and in 1867 was returned as a liberal-conservative borough MP for Bradford, with William Edward Forster as his colleague. He was not an ardent politician, and did not stand at the general election in 1868; but on the unseating of the conservative member, Henry William Ripley, in March 1869, he again contested the constituency, but was defeated. In 1871 and 1872 he was re-elected mayor of Bradford, and in October 1873 was publicly entertained and a presentation of plate made to him in recognition of his services.

In 1879 Thompson became chairman of the Midland Railway company. He was also chairman of the Glasgow and South-Western Railway, and a director and some time chairman of the Forth Bridge railway company. The sanction of parliament for the erection of the Forth Bridge had been obtained in 1873, but the work was not begun till 1882, and the direction of the policy of the Midland Railway company was greatly influenced by Thompson. The shareholders of the Forth Bridge company were guaranteed 4% on their capital by the North British, Midland, Great Northern, and North-Eastern companies, and the work was completed in January 1890, and formally opened by the Prince of Wales on 4 March 1890. On this occasion a baronetcy was conferred upon Thompson, in recognition of the ability with which he had helped forward the undertaking.

Thompson resigned the chairmanship of the Midland Railway company in 1890, owing to failing health. He died at Guiseley on 1 December 1891, and was buried on 5 December in the churchyard, Guiseley. By his wife, who survived him, he left three sons and two daughters

References

Notes

Attribution

External links 
 

1820 births
1891 deaths
Liberal Party (UK) MPs for English constituencies
UK MPs 1865–1868
Mayors of Bradford
Alumni of Trinity College, Cambridge
Members of the Inner Temple